88 (eighty-eight) is the natural number following 87 and preceding 89.

In mathematics 
88 is:

 a refactorable number.
 a primitive semiperfect number.
 an untouchable number.
 a hexadecagonal number.
 an Erdős–Woods number, since it is possible to find sequences of 88 consecutive integers such that each inner member shares a factor with either the first or the last member.
 a palindromic number in bases 5 (3235), 10 (8810), 21 (4421), and 43 (2243).
 a repdigit in bases 10, 21 and 43.
 a 2-automorphic number.
 the smallest positive integer with a Zeckendorf representation requiring 5 Fibonacci numbers.
 a strobogrammatic number.
 the largest number in English not containing the letter 'n' in its name, when using short scale.
88 and 945 are the smallest coprime abundant numbers.

In science and technology
The atomic number of the element radium.
 The number of constellations in the sky as defined by the International Astronomical Union.
 Messier object M88, a magnitude 11.0 spiral galaxy in the constellation Coma Berenices.
 The New General Catalogue object NGC 88, a spiral galaxy in the constellation Phoenix, and a member of Robert's Quartet.
 Space Shuttle Mission 88 (STS-88), launched and completed in December 1998, began the construction of the International Space Station.
 Approximately the number of days it takes Mercury to complete its orbit.

Cultural significance

In Chinese culture 

Number 88 symbolizes fortune and good luck in Chinese culture, since the word 8 sounds similar to the word fā (which implies , or wealth, in Mandarin or Cantonese). The number 8 is considered to be the luckiest number in Chinese culture, and prices in Chinese supermarkets often contain many 8s. The shape of the Chinese character for 8 implies that a person will have a great, wide future as the character starts narrow and gets wider toward the bottom. The Chinese government has been auctioning auto license plates containing many 8s for tens of thousands of dollars. The 2008 Beijing Olympics opened at 8 p.m., 8 August 2008.

In addition, 88 is also used to mean "bye bye" in Chinese-language chats, text messages, SMSs and IMs, because its pronunciation in Mandarin is similar to "bye bye".

In amateur radio
In amateur radio, 88 is used as shorthand for "love and kisses" when signing a message or ending an exchange. It is used in spoken word (radiotelephony), Morse code (radiotelegraphy), and in various digital modes. It is considered rather more intimate than "73", which means "best regards"; therefore 73 is more often used. The two may be used together. Sometimes either expression is pluralized by appending an -s. These number codes originate with the 92 Code adopted by Western Union in 1859.

In neo-Nazism

Neo-Nazis use the number 88 as an abbreviation for the Nazi salute Heil Hitler. The letter H is eighth in the alphabet, whereby 88 becomes HH.

Often, this number is associated with the number 14, e.g. 14/88, 14-88, or 1488; this number symbolizes the Fourteen Words coined by David Lane, a prominent white supremacist. Example uses of 88 include the song "88 Rock 'n' Roll Band" by Landser, and the organizations Column 88 and Unit 88.

The number is banned on Austrian license plates due to its association with "Heil Hitler [and] where H comes in the alphabet".

In sports 
 Professional golfer Kathy Whitworth, throughout her playing career won 88 LPGA Tour tournaments, more than anyone else has won on either the LPGA Tour or the PGA Tour.
 The Chicago White Sox went 88 years without winning a world Series from 1917 until 2005, when they swept the Houston Astros.

In other fields 

Eighty-eight (88) is also:

a popular ice cream bar manufactured by GB Glace
the number of keys on a typical piano (36 black and 52 white); a piano is sometimes called an "eighty eight"
88 Keys, character in the 1990 Dick Tracy film
 the digits indicated when all the segments of two seven-segment displays are illuminated
 Eighty Eight, a live album by the Christian rock band the 77s
in the titles of songs:
"Rocket 88", a song first recorded at Sam Phillips' studio in 1951; Rocket 88 was a 1980s United Kingdom band named for the song
"88 Lines About 44 Women" by the band The Nails
"88 Seconds in Greensboro" by the English new wave band OMD on their 1985 album, Crush
"88" by the Canadian punk band Sum 41 on their 2004 album, Chuck
"88" by the English nu-metal band Apartment 26 on their second album, Music for the Massive
"88", a song by Level 42 on the album Strategy
"88" by hip hop act the Cool Kids
"88" by the Japanese electro-pop duo LM.C, or Lovely Mocochang.com

the model number of the Oldsmobile 88 automobile and the AGM-88 HARM missile
the QBU-88 (or Type 88) Chinese sniper rifle
the number of the French department of Vosges
the designation of two freeways named Interstate 88, one in Illinois and another in New York
in Japanese, often used to mean "a great many" or "countless" or infinite numbers
in Chinese SMS or chat, short for "bye bye", from the Mandarin pronunciation "ba1 ba1" (8 - 8)
in hip hop, where "88" stands for "HH", short for "hip hop"
in Kill Bill, the name of O-Ren Ishii's Army, the Crazy 88
the ISBN Group Identifier for books published in Italy and Switzerland
in the Back to the Future film trilogy, 88 is the speed (in miles per hour) that the DeLorean automobile must attain in order to travel in time. 
in the TV series Black Books (Series 2, Episode 2: "Fever"), the temperature (presumably in Fahrenheit) above which Manny's case of Dave's Syndrome will trigger, supposedly a parody of the similar use of the number 88 in the Back to the Future trilogy
"the number of the Anti-Terrorist" in the documents submitted to NBC by Seung-Hui Cho prior to the Virginia Tech shooting on 16 April 2007 
the number of an anti-terrorist police squad, called "Detachment 88", set up by the Indonesian government following the 2002 Bali bombings which killed 202 people, including 88 Australians
Tanner '88, Garry Trudeau's HBO series on the fictional campaign of Congressman Jack Tanner in his bid for the White House
88 Minutes, a 2008 film starring Al Pacino
88, a 2015 Canadian thriller film
88rising, hip hop and rap collective and record label consisting of primarily Asian and Asian American artists.
the Group of 88, a group of 88 professors at Duke University who signed a controversial advertisement published after a woman falsely claimed to have been raped by members of Duke's lacrosse team
the Cambridge Z88 was a 1988 portable computer
88open was an industry standards group in 1988 created by Motorola to standardize Unix systems
 an '88-level' is a named condition in the COBOL programming language
The House on East 88th Street, a book by Bernard Waber
88-Keys, an American record producer and rapper
88Glam, a Canadian hip-hop duo
 the dead man's hand in poker is a pair of aces and a pair of 8s.  
 88 is the name of a gang in the 2006 American film Gridiron Gang starring Dwayne Johnson
 In the United States Navy, 88 is slang for the word "what".  For example, "88 are you doing tonight?"
 Two genera of butterflies (Diaethria and Callicore) are called eighty-eights because markings on their wings look like the number 88.
 The German 8.8 cm FlaK 18/36/37/41 anti-aircraft gun used in WWII was often referred to colloquially as an "88".
 the number of counties in Ohio, a state in the United States
 R88 is the designation for "all runways" in METAR/TAF weather data
 The 88 is an American pop rock band.
 "Lucky 88", a song by Speedy Ortiz
 88 Precepts, a Neo-Nazi manifesto

References

Integers
Numerology